Bulbophyllum rhodoglossum is a species of orchid in the genus Bulbophyllum, first described by Rudolf Schlechter in 1913 in Repertorium Specierum Novarum Regni Vegetabilis. It is an epiphyte growing in Papua New Guinea on trees in mountain forests around 1000 metres in elevation. The flowers are white, and the labellum red with a yellow tip.

References

External links 
 The Bulbophyllum-Checklist
 The Internet Orchid Species Photo Encyclopedia

rhodoglossum
Plants described in 1913
Orchids of Papua New Guinea